At Home with the Braithwaites is a British comedy-drama television series, created and written by Sally Wainwright (except for the final four episodes). The storyline follows a suburban family in Leeds, whose life is turned upside down when the mother of the family wins £38 million on the lottery. It was broadcast on ITV and produced by Yorkshire Television for 26 episodes, from 20 January 2000 to 9 April 2003.

At the beginning of the first series, each member of the Braithwaite family has an issue. Mother Alison has to decide what to do with the winnings, and when to tell her family; father David is having an affair with Elaine, his secretary; eldest daughter Virginia is on the verge of dropping out of university; middle daughter Sarah has a crush on her drama teacher; and youngest daughter Charlotte suspects that Alison may be the mystery lottery winner.

Cast

Characters

Dame Alison Jane Braithwaite DBE
Alison is the matriarch of the family. She is upstanding and unselfish.  She cares for her family; however, through her deception, she often hurts them. After winning the lottery, she adopts a new Dynasty-resembling look; however, her taste "leaves a lot to be desired" as one character puts it. She has extramarital affairs with her brother-in-law and even her gardener, who is 20 years her junior.

David Braithwaite
David is the patriarch of the family. He is not as close to his children as Alison, and has a stormy relationship with eldest daughter Virginia; however, she is the only one he ever confides in. He has been having an affair for some time with his PA. He loathes his younger brother, Graham, who has an affair with Alison.

Virginia Rowena Braithwaite
Virginia is the eldest daughter. She is wanton, feckless and usually entirely selfish. She is closest to her mother, but has the confidences of both her parents. She is an open lesbian and has an ongoing relationship with Tamsin and an on-off affair with Megan. She works as a mechanic occasionally and studies at the University of York. She is described by sister Sarah as being her 'chain-smoking, screwed-up dyke of a sister'.

Sarah Elizabeth Braithwaite
The middle daughter, Sarah is immature, needy and promiscuous. She becomes pregnant by a neighbour in series one, marries and divorces him in series two, and has an affair with a teacher in her sixth form in series three. She is often the only daughter not to know family secrets, as one parent usually entrusts Virginia with the truth, while Charlotte's investigative nature usually uncovers it.

Charlotte Braithwaite
Charlotte is the youngest daughter. Still in her teenage years, she is a gawky loner. She is a quiet child and usually finds out secrets through her inquisitive nature. She is occasionally capable of sociopathic behaviour.

Megan Hartnoll
Megan is originally a neighbour of the Braithwaites and lives with husband Mike. She is spiteful, manipulative and a constant threat to the happiness of the Braithwaites, especially Virginia, with whom she has an affair. She is electrocuted in the fourth series.

Mike Hartnoll
Mike is the husband of Megan and is strongly attracted to Alison. While Alison feels sorry for him because of his loneliness, the rest of the family find him an annoyance. He is self-pitying, self-righteous, self-indulged and prone to making long drunken diatribes. As David describes him, he is the sort of man whom you invite to a party in the hope he cannot come.

Graham Braithwaite
Graham is David's brother. After Alison and David split, he lies to Alison telling her he's separated, and the two begin an affair. When she finds out it's adulterous, she leaves him, but he refuses to leave her alone and his behaviour becomes obsessive. Alison falls pregnant with his baby, and she and David try to pass the baby off as theirs. Graham, however, finds out. He is devious, calculating and manipulative, yet intelligent and articulate, which enables him to deceive others easily.

Plot

Series One
In the first series of six episodes Alison decides, for the time being, to not tell her family about the lottery win as she worries it may have a negative effect on them. In an attempt to do something good with the money, she starts a charity with the help of her good friend, Marion, and an idealistic out-of-work accountant, Pauline. David begins to regret having started an affair. Virginia falls in love with their new next door neighbour, the selfish and manipulative Megan. A group of journalists attempt to track down and reveal the identity of the mystery lottery winner. Sarah has her advances toward her drama teacher rejected, and she reacts by sleeping with Phil, the boy next door, and becomes pregnant. By the end of the series, the truth comes out regarding Alison's lottery win and David's affair.

Series Two
In the second series of eight episodes, the Braithwaites have moved into a mansion in the countryside. Alison and David struggle to rebuild their marriage and end up separating. Alison then has a romance with David's brother, Graham, much to David's dismay, until she realises that Graham is still seeing his wife. Sarah gives birth to a son and secretly marries Phil. Charlotte starts getting bullied at school because of her family's newfound wealth. Virginia is going out with Tamsin, a kind and sensible girl, but is still obsessed with Megan. By the end of the series, Alison and David decide to give their marriage another go.

Series Three
In the third series of six episodes, Alison is awarded a damehood by the Queen for her charity work, and discovers that she is pregnant with Graham's baby. David suggests that they pretend he is the father, until it comes out that Graham actually is. Tamsin is also pregnant, as the result of a one night stand with a guy from university. She and Virginia decide to raise the child together, until Tamsin realises that Virginia is still infatuated with Megan. A newspaper prints a story saying that it was 12-year-old Charlotte who purchased the winning lottery ticket, and the lottery company take the family to court, claiming back all £38 million as it was illegal for an under-16 to enter the lottery. A heavily pregnant Alison cracks and confesses during the trial, forcing the Braithwaites back to their old home and their old lives. Sarah starts seeing a married teacher. By the end of the series, Alison gives birth to a baby girl, Katherine 'Kate/Katie', and the family manage to retrieve their fortune following a legal technicality and a retrial.

Series Four
In the fourth and final series of six episodes, Alison and David start divorce proceedings. Alison has a romance with her gardener, Nick. David starts seeing Elaine again. Sarah quits college, and starts a business as a wedding planner. She also discovers that Phil, the father of her child, still has feelings for her. Charlotte starts going out with Jordan, Elaine's son, and the pair hatch a plan to get rid of the lottery winnings that Charlotte believes has caused all of the problems within her family. Virginia has finally to choose between Tamsin, who now has a baby girl, Rowena, and Megan. Disapproving of her recent actions, Virginia, Sarah, and Charlotte all struggle to get along with Alison. The final scene of the series sees the whole family, and their friends, arguing with each other, as Charlotte announces that she thinks she might be pregnant.

Sally Wainwright wrote the first two episodes of this series while Jonathan Harvey wrote the next two with the final episodes written by Katie Baxendale.

Overseas
The series was shown on ABC and UK.TV in Australia; TV3 in Ireland; TV One and Prime in New Zealand; NRK in Norway; RTV Slovenija in Slovenia; BBC America in the United States; TVB Pearl in Hong Kong; YLE in Finland; and Yes Plus in Israel.

DVD release
Series one, two, three and four of At Home with the Braithwaites are all available on DVD (Region 2, UK).

The first and second series are also available on DVD (Region 1, USA and Canada) from Acorn Media.

Series one, two, three and four are all available on Region 4 (Aus) DVD individually, and as a complete series box set. The Series 3 and Series 4 DVDs are missing segments of the programs. Region 2 DVDS are complete and uncut.

Australia releases:
At Home with the Braithwaites – Complete Series 1 (2 disc set) – 16 February 2007
At Home with the Braithwaites – Complete Series 2 (2 disc set) – 7 May 2007
At Home with the Braithwaites – Complete Series 3 (2 disc set) – 3 July 2007
At Home with the Braithwaites – Complete Series 4 (2 disc set) – 5 September 2007
At Home with the Braithwaites – The Complete Series (8 disc box set) – 2 December 2007

Ratings
Episode viewing figures from BARB.

References

External links

2000s British comedy-drama television series
2000 British television series debuts
2003 British television series endings
2000s British LGBT-related drama television series
British comedy-drama television shows
2000s British LGBT-related comedy television series
English-language television shows
Lesbian-related television shows
Television shows set in Leeds
Television shows set in Yorkshire
Television series created by Sally Wainwright
ITV comedy
ITV television dramas
Television series by ITV Studios
Television series by Yorkshire Television